Waltham Abbey is a town and civil parish in the Epping Forest District of Essex, within the metropolitan and urban area of London, England,  north-east of Charing Cross. It lies on the Greenwich Meridian, between the River Lea in the west and Epping Forest in the east, with large sections forming part of the Metropolitan Green Belt. The town borders Nazeing and Epping Upland to the north, Chingford to the south, Loughton, Theydon Bois and Buckhurst Hill to the east and south-east, and Waltham Cross, Cheshunt and Enfield to the west.

Historically an ancient parish named Waltham Holy Cross in the Waltham hundred of Essex, it became a local government district in 1850, and was granted urban district status in 1894. Whilst the use of the name Waltham Abbey for the town dates back to the 16th century at the earliest, the parish itself was not renamed until 1974, when the Waltham Holy Cross Urban District was abolished and succeeded by Waltham Abbey Town Council. The town council is based at Waltham Abbey Town Hall, and operates as part of the wider Epping Forest District. The town was included in the Metropolitan Police District in 1840, and the London postal district upon its inception in 1856. As a London suburb, the town formed part of the review area for the Royal Commission on Local Government in Greater London, but did not become part of the proposed Greater London administrative area in 1965, remaining in the Essex County Council area, unlike most other parts of metropolitan Essex.

The town takes its name from and is renowned for its former abbey, the last in England to be dissolved, now the Abbey Church of Waltham Holy Cross and St Lawrence, a scheduled ancient monument and the town's parish church. It is believed to be the final resting place of King Harold Godwinson, who died in the Battle of Hastings in 1066. The town is twinned with the German town of Hörstel. As of the 2021 census, Waltham Abbey had a population of 22,859.

History

Early history
The name Waltham derives from weald or wald "forest" and ham "homestead" or "enclosure". The name of the ancient parish was Waltham Holy Cross, but the use of the name Waltham Abbey for the town seems to have originated in the 16th century, although there has often been inconsistency in the use of the two names. Indeed, the parish was originally named Waltham Holy Cross, and renamed Waltham Abbey by order of the town council in 1974.

There are traces of prehistoric and Roman settlement in the town. Ermine Street lies only 5 km west and the causeway across the River Lea from Waltham Cross in Hertfordshire may be a Roman construction. A local legend claims that Boudica's rebellion against the Romans ended in the neighbourhood, when she poisoned herself with hemlock gathered on the banks of Cobbins Brook.

Abbey as main landowner

The recorded history of the town began during the reign of Canute in the early 11th century when his standard-bearer Tovi or Tofig the Proud, founded (or rebuilt) a church here to house the miraculous cross discovered at Montacute in Somerset. It is this cross that gave Waltham the earliest suffix to its name. After Tovi's death around 1045, Waltham reverted to the King (Edward the Confessor), who gave it to the Earl Harold Godwinson (later king). Harold rebuilt Tovi's church in stone around 1060, in gratitude it is said for his cure from a paralysis, through praying before the miraculous cross. Waltham's people used the abbey as their parish church, and paid their tithes, worked the glebe as well any of their lord's land, and paid other dues to the canons.

Legend has it that after his death at the Battle of Hastings in 1066, Harold's body was brought to Waltham for burial near to the High Altar. Today, the spot is marked by a stone slab in the churchyard (originally the site of the high altar before the Reformation).In 1177, as part of his penance for his part in the murder of Thomas Becket, Archbishop of Canterbury, Henry II refounded Harold's church as a priory of Augustinian Canons Regular of sixteen canons and a prior or dean. In 1184, this was enlarged so that Waltham became an abbey with an abbot and twenty-four canons, which grew to be the richest monastery in Essex. To the abbey's west and south, the town grew as a linear development around a crossing road, although it had a single north–south "High Street" as late as 1848.

In the medieval and early Tudor periods, there were two guilds in the parish, each with an endowment for a priest: the Brotherhood of Our Lady, and the Charnel Guild, whose priest was also the parish curate. The former, which existed from at least 1375, occupied the Lady Chapel in the parochial part of the church. The Charnel Guild, which occurs as 'the Sepulchre' in 1366, probably used its crypt.
 
The town's dependence on the Abbey is signalled by its decline after the Abbey was dissolved and partially demolished in 1540, the last working abbey or monastery to be dissolved. Waltham Abbey vicarage is a 17th-century timber framed and plastered building. It was given by Edward Denny, 1st Earl of Norwich to create the first curacy, but was much altered in the 18th century and later, and was more recently architecturally Grade II*listed. In the early 19th century the church held three Sunday services, including one in the evening for the local factory workers. In 1862, Holy Communion was celebrated monthly and attended by about 100.

Post-Reformation
In the 17th century there were four churchwardens (who fulfilled some roles of local government, collected and distributing poor relief): one each for the town, Holyfield, Upshire, and Sewardstone. Joseph Hall, curate from 1608, was later Bishop successively of Exeter and Norwich. A complete diocesan list of curates was printed to 1888 and Thomas Fuller, author of The Worthies of England and of the first History of Waltham Abbey, was curate 1649–58.

In the 17th century, a gunpowder factory was opened in the town, no doubt due to good river communications and empty marshland by the River Lea and this now forms the museum below.

Post-Industrial Revolution
The factory was sold to the government in 1787 and was greatly expanded during the next century, becoming the Waltham Abbey Royal Gunpowder Mills. In the 19th century, searches began for more powerful and reliant propellant explosives, and guncotton was developed here by Frederick Abel, starting in 1863. Cordite production began in 1891 and the site was enlarged several times. The site was an obvious target during World War II, and a German V-2 rocket landed near the factory in Highbridge Street on 7 March 1945, causing considerable damage to property and large loss of life. The factory eventually closed in 1943, and the site was developed into an explosives research establishment. There was also a fulling mill at Sewardstone around 1777 and a pin factory by 1805. Silk and calico printing were also important industries. The River Lee Navigation was also improved, a new canal cut across the marshes was opened in 1769, bringing more trade to the town. Outside the town, the parish is largely rural and agriculture has been an important occupation.

In the first half of the 20th century, the area was extensively covered in glass-houses and market gardens. Gravel extraction has also long been a major industry in the Lea Valley, leaving a legacy of pits now used for recreation and an important wildlife habitat. In 1959–60 all of the church's houses and land were converted to stock or bank investments. No rectory has existed – the benefice before becoming the present vicarage serving four churches in the wider area was a perpetual curacy — a relevant fact for the purposes of chancel repair liability that therefore cannot exist. In the 1960s and 1970s, the population of the town increased, partly by an extensive programme of clearances and redevelopment in the town centre, and partly by the development of housing estates on the outskirts, such as Roundhills and Ninefields.

Geography
The River Lea, which forms the county boundary with Hertfordshire, is the town's western boundary, and the eastern boundary runs through Epping Forest. The land rises gradually from the marshes and meadows by the river to a small plateau of london clay in the east, 60–90 metres above sea level, capped in the highest parts by the sand and gravel of Epping Forest. On the river the elevations range from 22m in the northwest to 13.5m in the southwest. To the southwest, occupying a former course of the River Lea, is the King George V Reservoir, opened in 1913. Cobbins Brook, a tributary of the River Lea, crosses the parish from east to west. Waltham Abbey parish includes in its 41 km2 the villages and hamlets of High Beach, Holyfield, Sewardstone and Upshire. The M25 motorway runs to the south of the town through the middle of the parish and can be accessed east of the town at Junction 26 via Honey Lane or the rural relief road, the A121 directly south of the motorway.

Watercourses
Over the centuries many channels have been dug to divide the River Lea and drain the westernmost land. These channels flow southward across Cheshunt Marsh and part of Waltham Abbey parish;
Cornmill Stream
Old River Lea
Millhead Stream
River Lee Flood Relief Channel, the southern distributary of the Old River Lea and Horsemill Stream
River Lee Navigation
Small River Lea

Tributaries of the Lea River System
Cobbins Brook flows through the town from the east and northeast.

Governance 
Waltham Abbey has formed part of the Epping Forest parliamentary constituency since 1974, represented by Dame Eleanor Laing MP of the Conservative Party since 1997.

Prior to 1974, the town formed part of the Epping constituency, served by Sir Winston Churchill as its Member of Parliament between 1924 and 1945.

Waltham Abbey Town Council, based at Waltham Abbey Town Hall, serves as Waltham Abbey's parish council, to which eleven councillors are elected from five wards: High Beech (2 councillors), Honey Lane (3 councillors), North East (2 councillors), Paternoster (2 councillors), and South West (2 councillors). The mayor of Waltham Abbey is currently Jeane Lea of the Conservative Party.

The local authority is Epping Forest District Council, to which the town elects ten councillors from the same wards: High Beech (1 councillor), Honey Lane (3 councillors), North East (2 councillors), Paternoster (2 councillors), and South West (2 councillors). The town currently has 8 Conservative councillors on the district council, 1 far-right British Democratic Party councillor (defected from the For Britain Movement), and a vacancy. Epping Forest District Council operates with a Conservative majority. The Epping Forest District has the status of non-metropolitan district, and forms part of the non-metropolitan county of Essex, the area governed by Essex County Council.

Architecturally notable buildings

The Welsh Harp in the Market Square is a half-timbered inn, mostly dating from the 15th century. The Lychgate passage beside the inn leads to the churchyard.
A former inn, at the corner of Sun Street and the Market Square, is now a barbers. A carved wooden bracket in the form of a hermaphrodite holding a jug supports the projecting upper storey.
Waltham Abbey Town Hall in Highbridge Street, dating from 1904, is a fine and rare example of an Art Nouveau public building.
Two notable 18th-century buildings are Essex House in Sewardstone Street and St. Kilda's in Highbridge Street.
At Upshire is a group of cottages known as the Blue Row. They are weatherboarded and with bark still visible on the roof.

Notable residents

 Harriadnie Beau (born 1993), fashion model and brand ambassador
 Lady Victoria Buxton (1839–1916), philanthropist
 Archibald Corble (1883–1944), fencer
 Thomas Dangerfield (c.1650–1685), conspirator, born in Waltham Abbey
 Lawrence of Durham (c.1110–1154), poet and prior, was born at Waltham
 John Foxe (1516/17–1587), author of Foxe's Book of Martyrs, lived in a street now called Foxes Parade. The book was hung in chains on a pillar in Waltham Abbey Church
 Sir George Gardiner (1935–2002), Conservative and Referendum Party Member of Parliament for Reigate
 Terry Lawrence (1910–1989), cricketer 
 Thomas Leverton (c.1743–1824), architect 
 Albert Monk (1900–1975), Australian trade unionist, born in Waltham Abbey 
 Connor Ogilvie (born 1996), footballer, was born in Waltham Abbey, currently playing for Portsmouth in League One, England's 3rd tier of football
 Fiona Pennie (born 1982), Olympic slalom canoeist, lives in Waltham Abbey
 Thomas Reeve (1594–1672), Anglican divine
 Roy Shaw (1936–2012), author, businessman and former East End gangster, lived in the area
 W. E. Shewell-Cooper (1900–1982), organic gardener and pioneer of no-dig gardening, was born in Waltham Abbey
 Kate Silverton (born 1970), journalist and BBC News presenter, was born and raised in Waltham Abbey
 Tony West (born 1972), darts player

Landmarks

Abbey Church

The medieval Waltham Abbey Church was kept as it was close to a town and is still used as a parish church. In addition there are other remains of the former abbey – the Grade II*listed Midnight Chapel, the gatehouse, a vaulted passage and Harold's Bridge – all in the care of English Heritage.
 These grounds are notable for the reputed grave of Harold II or "Harold Godwinson", the last Anglo-Saxon King of England.

Local museum
Housed in a building dating back to 1520 is the Epping Forest District Museum, which tells the story of the people who have lived and worked in this part of south Essex from the earliest times to the present.

Royal Gunpowder Mills
On the site of a former gunpowder factory another museum illustrates the evolution of explosives and the development of the Royal Gunpowder Mills (an Anchor Point of ERIH, The European Route of Industrial Heritage) through interactive and traditional exhibitions and displays. The site hosts living history and battle re-enactment events most summer weekends and also offers a self-guided nature walk that shows visitors the ecology that has reclaimed much of the remaining .

Regional park
The former gravel pits in the Lea Valley and parts of the former Abbey Gardens are now in the care of the Lee Valley Regional Park Authority for recreational use and nature conservation.

Tourism Centre
The Epping Forest Conservation Centre in High Beach provides information, maps, books, cards, displays and advice for visitors to the area.

Sport
Waltham Abbey has one senior non-League football club, Waltham Abbey F.C. which plays at Capershotts.

Waltham Abbey is also home to the Essex Arrows Baseball Club, founded by local resident, Louis Courtney in 1981 and later affiliated to the British Baseball Federation in 1984 by Phil Chesterton.

Religion

The Anglican abbey church is dedicated to St Lawrence. The town has long had a Catholic church. For some decades this was in a former Methodist chapel, an irregularly shaped Edwardian building of stone-dressed red brick with a roof of Welsh slate tiles in free late gothic style with a belfry. In 2008 the congregation moved to a more modern building, and sold the former building to an Evangelical Free church.

Demography 
As of the 2021 census, the population of Waltham Abbey was 22,859, an increase from 21,149 in 2011.

63.8% of the town's population was Christian at the 2011 census, with 25.3% declaring themselves irreligious. Minority religious groups include the Muslim and Jewish populations, forming 1.7 and 1.1 percent of the population respectively.

The 2021 census showed that 74.6% of the town's population identified as White British.

Transport

There are no railway lines or stations in Waltham Abbey itself, although there are several located nearby. The nearest railway stations are Waltham Cross, Chingford and Cheshunt. The nearest London Underground station is Loughton, on the Central line.

Several bus routes are operated in Waltham Abbey, some of which were originally operated by London Transport.

The last remaining London Buses route that runs through Waltham Abbey is route 215 from Lee Valley Camp Site to Walthamstow Central. Other current bus routes include Arriva 66 (Waltham Cross to Loughton, previously 250/255/555), Arriva 251 (Hammond Street to Upshire), 505 (Harlow to Chingford, now Saturdays only).

Former London Buses routes in Waltham Abbey include route 242 (Chingford Station to Potters Bar via Cheshunt), route 250 (Waltham Cross to South Woodford via Loughton), route 317 (Enfield Town to Upshire) and route 279/night bus N279 (Smithfield or Victoria to Upshire, nightly).

The M25 motorway runs through the town, with Junction 26 at Waltham Abbey.

Notes and references

Notes

References

External links

Waltham Abbey Town Council

 
Market towns in Essex
Epping Forest District
Towns in Essex